This is a list of public art in Belgravia, a district in the City of Westminster and the Royal Borough of Kensington and Chelsea in London. The area is mainly composed of early 19th-century residential buildings, many of which now serve diplomatic uses. Several of the figures commemorated here were influential in the early development of Belgravia under the ownership of the Grosvenor family (later the Dukes of Westminster). Belgrave Square, which gives the locale its name, has a particularly high number of embassies; its public sculptures are therefore of a pronounced international character.

City of Westminster

Royal Borough of Kensington and Chelsea

References

Bibliography

 

 

 

 

 

 

 

Public art
Belgravia